Calling Lake is a large lake in north-central Alberta, Canada.

The lake's name comes from the First Nations of the area, who heard the lake ice cracking.

The Calling Lake Provincial Park is located on the southern shore of the lake, and the Jean Baptiste Gambler 183 First Nations reserve of the Bigstone Cree Nation is established in the hamlet of Calling Lake on the eastern shore.

The waters of the lake are drained through the Calling River into the Athabasca River.

See also
List of lakes in Alberta

References 

Lakes of Alberta
Municipal District of Opportunity No. 17